Jermaine Jackson is an American music artist.

Jermaine Jackson may also refer to:
 Jermaine La Jaune "Jay" Jackson, Jr., son of Jermaine Jackson and Hazel Joy Gordy, actor and music producer
 Jermaine Jackson (album), a 1984 album by Jermaine Jackson
 Jermaine Jackson (basketball) (born 1976), American professional basketball player
 Jermaine Jackson (hip hop producer), American hip hop producer
 Jermaine Jackson (gridiron football) (born 1982), Canadian football wide receiver

Jackson, Jermaine